Rai Bahadur Thandalam Gopala Rao (c. 1832 – 11 May 1886) was an Indian educator who, along with William Archer Porter, was responsible for the growth of the Government Arts College, Kumbakonam in its early stages.

Early life 

Gopala Rao was born in a Thanjavur Marathi family in the village of Ganapathi Agraharam near Kumbakonam. His grandfather Thandalam Jeevanna (also known as Ramachandra Pandit) had worked as a Tahsildar in the service of the British East India Company, while his father Raghava Punt served as a revenue officer under Serfoji II.

During Rao's infancy, the family moved to Tiruvadi and from there to Travancore where Gopala Rao served in the Travancore service. Gopala Rao had little schooling but achieved proficiency in Marathi, Sanskrit and English. At the age of 17, Gopala Rao was employed as a clerk in the office of the collector of Tanjore. In 1851, he was promoted Manager of the Department of Public Works.

Educational career 

In 1854, Gopala Rao entered the educational department as First Assistant in the newly established provincial school (later Government Arts College) at Kumbakonam. Gopala Rao passed his matriculation in 1857 and graduated in arts from the Madras University in first class in 1859.

In 1867, the provincial school at Kumbakonam was elevated to a government arts college. Gopala Rao and William Archer Porter were instrumental for its elevation. They were also credited with having built up the reputation of the college.

From 1870 to 1872, Gopala Rao acted as the Inspector of Schools, the first Indian to be appointed to the post. In reward for his success, Gopala Rao was made a fellow of the Madras University. In the same year, he succeeded William Archer Porter as the Principal of the Kumbakonam College and served till 1874. In 1878, Gopala Rao was appointed Professor of History and Political Economy at the Presidency College, Madras.

Death 

In 1883, Gopala Rao was struck with fever. He hurried to Kumbakonam for rest. Gopala Rao returned to Madras soon afterwards but died on 11 May 1886.

References 

 
 

1832 births
1886 deaths
19th-century Indian educational theorists
People from Thanjavur district
University of Madras alumni
Founders of Indian schools and colleges
Scholars from Chennai
Educators from Tamil Nadu